A Mother's Prayer for Her Boy Out There is a World War I era song released in 1918. Andrew B. Sterling wrote the lyrics and Arthur Lange composed the music. It was written for voice and piano.

The song was published by Joe Morris Music Co. of New York City. On the cover is a woman kneeling down to pray, with a picture of a soldier hanging on the wall behind her.

The lyrics tell the story of a mother who is struggling with the fact that her son is fighting in war. The only way she can find solace is through prayer. It is told in from the third-person point of view. The chorus is as follows:

The sheet music can be found at the Library of Congress and Pritzker Military Museum & Library.

References

Songs about mothers
Songs about soldiers
1918 songs
Songs of World War I
Songs with lyrics by Andrew B. Sterling
Songs with music by Arthur Lange